Phil Kelly (Artist)  (1950–2010)  was an Irish expressionist painter who became a Mexican citizen in 1999.

Biography
Phil Kelly was brought up in England with strong influences from his Irish ancestry. He was educated at Rugby School and studied Art and Special Education at college in Bath. On leaving college he lived in London, Portugal and then in Whitby, North Yorkshire, all with fellow artist Ann Woods, seeking to establish himself as a painter while earning money through a variety of jobs including van driving, farmwork and teaching. From 1974 to 1981, he exhibited his work in small galleries wherever he lived, some in Portugal, some in the UK. In 1982 he made his first visit to Mexico and a new chapter in his life began. Until now his paintings were influenced by such artists as Freud, Auerbach and Jack Yeats and by the landscape and colours of Northern Europe. Now the colour and light of Mexico brought a new dimension to his work. He stayed for three years and by chance was out of the country when the Mexican earthquake devastated the apartment where he lived, killing his partner Blanca. Kelly returned to London, working where he could, usually teaching and exhibiting in several small London galleries, these were often one-man shows.

The lure of Mexico and particularly the city with its extreme existence, its palm trees and brightly painted VW taxis was irresistible. In 1989 he was back and in the following year married Ruth Munguia, an experienced arts administrator, who took over the management of his exhibitions and professional life. Regular exhibitions followed in Mexico and occasionally in London, with several pieces selling at Christie's (1991 and 1992).

In 1993, Ruth and Phil's first daughter, Ana Elena, was born. 1996 was a breakthrough year for Kelly with a significant exhibition at the Westbourne Gallery in London, an exhibition at The Hay Festival of Literature, with one of his paintings featured on the cover of The Festival Brochure and a major exhibition at the Museo de Arte Contemporaneo in Mexico City: Babel Descrifada. This exhibition caused debate and some notoriety in the Mexican press, but Kelly's reputation was firmly established. Daniel Dultzin, Mexican ambassador to Ireland, championed his work and his first Irish exhibition opened at The Frederick Gallery in Dublin, in 1997, further exhibitions followed both at The Frederick Gallery and in later years at Hillsboro Fine Art.  1997 also saw the birth of Maria Jose, Phil and Ruth's second daughter. Attending events at embassies in Mexico and Ireland, Kelly befriended the poet Seamus Heaney and his wife, the writer Marie Heaney, painting them several times and adding illustrations to their works published in Mexico. The chef, writer and broadcaster, Rick Stein commissioned a series of paintings for his Seafood Restaurant in Padstow, Cornwall, UK and has written about Phil for the national press. In 1999, Kelly became a Mexican citizen. Notable Mexican collectors of Phil's work include the poet Pura López Colomé, wrestler Marco Rascon Cordova and businessman Sergio Autrey Maza. Regular exhibitions take place in Mexico, Ireland and occasionally in England.

Kelly's work is the work of an urban painter, one who lived in the ultimate urban environment of Mexico City. As well as the many cityscapes of Mexico DF, Kelly produced a number of striking figurative works, paintings of Oaxaca and Dublin, seascapes of Mexico and Cornwall and many ink drawings.

Phil Kelly's paintings are still exhibited regularly and he has work in several notable Mexican museums, including  The Museum of Modern Art in Mexico City and The Museum of Modern Art of Oaxaca. Various paintings and drawings have been used as artwork for books published in Mexico, Ireland and in the UK and there are many pieces in private collections.

References

Sources
"Babel Deciphered" Teresa del Conde, La Jornada (Cultural section)  January 24, 1997 Mexico DF
"Babel Deciphered: The plastic idiom of Kelly", Miguel Angel Munoz, Reforma (El Angel Supplement) February 2, 1997
"A Swirl of Mexico" Aidan Dunne, The Irish Times (The Arts), February 26, 2000.
"The Seafood Interior by the Irish Painter Phil Kelly", Rick Stein, The Times, London, England, April 24, 2002
Obituary: The Irish Times August 7  www.irishtimes.com
Obituary: The Times September 4, 2010  www.thetimes.co.uk
Obituary - Other Lives: The Guardian 6 October 2010 www.guardian.co.uk/artanddesign/2010/oct/06/phil-kelly-obituary
Phil Kelly - Dos Horas y Veinticinco Anos. Grupo Fogra 2005 ISBN 970 - 9834 - 00 - 2

External links
http://andrewdownie.wordpress.com/2010/08/13/the-painter-is-dead-long-live-the-painter/
https://web.archive.org/web/20100923075405/http://www.poder360.com/article_detail.php?id_article=4680
 Phil Kelly
 (http://grandenchilada.blogspot.com/2010/08/phil-kelly.html)

1950 births
2010 deaths
20th-century Irish painters
21st-century Irish painters
Irish male painters
Irish emigrants to Mexico
People educated at Rugby School
20th-century Irish male artists